Elusa mediorufa is a species of moth of the family Noctuidae. It was described by George Hampson in 1909 and is known from Borneo.

The forewings are pale brown. The margins are dark.

References

Moths described in 1909
Hadeninae
Moths of Borneo